Robert Vaughan (1834 – 12 July 1865) was an Australian cricketer. He played two first-class matches for New South Wales between 1855/56 and 1857/58.

See also
 List of New South Wales representative cricketers

References

External links
 

1834 births
1865 deaths
Australian cricketers
New South Wales cricketers
Place of birth missing